Australian Railway History is a monthly magazine covering railway history in Australia, published by the New South Wales Division of the Australian Railway Historical Society on behalf of its state and territory Divisions.

History and profile
It was first published in 1937 as the Australasian Railway and Locomotive Historical Society Bulletin, being renamed ARHS Bulletin in 1952. In January 2004, the magazine was re-branded as Australian Railway History.

Historically, the magazine had a mix of articles dealing with historical material and items on current events drawn from its affiliate publications. Today, it contains only historical articles, two or three of them being in-depth.

Parameters 
 Size     : A4; about A5 (originally)
 Issue    : March 2017 is vol. 69 number 953, January 2019 is vol 70, number 975

References

Publication details

Australian Railway History: bulletin of the Australian Railway Historical Society Redfern, New South Wales  Vol. 55, no. 795 (Jan. 2004)-
Bulletin (Australian Railway Historical Society) Redfern, New South Wales 1952-2003 .  New ser., v. 3, no. 178 (Aug. 1952)-v. 54, no. 794 (Dec. 2003)

1937 establishments in Australia
Monthly magazines published in Australia
Rail transport magazines published in Australia
Magazines established in 1937
History of rail transport in Australia